With My Sorrows is a maxi-CD and 10-inch clear vinyl release by the band Black Tape for a Blue Girl. It was released in 1997 by Italy's Amplexus Records. It was released with a limited number of 1000 for the CD & 300 for the vinyl. Sam Rosenthal, the leader of the band,  said: "in 1996, stefano of Italy’s amplexus label asked if I’d like to release a CD in his limited edition series. My initial idea was to remix songs from Remnants of a Deeper Purity, focusing on the string sections; a recycling program of sorts. When I started working on With My Sorrows parts 2 + 3, I heard “new songs” evolving out of the suddenly stripped bare string tracks. I feel there is a very interesting passion and intensity in these pieces, thus the emotions outweigh any perceived imperfections. I have always believed this to be true."

Sources

Black Tape for a Blue Girl albums
1997 EPs